William John Moulden (30 June 1889 – 26 June 1977) was an Australian rules footballer who played with Geelong in the Victorian Football League (VFL).

Family
The son of William Frederick Moulden (1857–1892), and Alice Moulden (1866–1959) née Le Batt (later, Mrs. Thomas Alfred Reed), William John Moulden was born at Colac, Victoria on 30 June 1889.

He married Florence Edith Brown (1895–1920) in 1918.

Football
Recruited from the Chilwell Football Club in the Geelong and District Junior Football Association,

He retired at the end of 1920, having played in the last five home-and-away matches of the season, due to "injured knees".

Death
He died at Birregurra, Victoria on 26 June 1977.

Notes

References

External links 

1889 births
1977 deaths
Australian rules footballers from Victoria (Australia)
Geelong Football Club players